Jevans is a surname. Notable people with the surname include:

John Jevans (by 1525–1565), English politician

See also
Jevons